Bislet Baths is a swimming pool and fitness center in Oslo, designed by the architects Harald Aars and Lorentz Harboe Ree. The facility is located in Bislett not far from Bislett Stadium, and it was completed in 1920.

In 2011, the Norwegian Directorate for Cultural Heritage gave the building protected status. It was one of the country's most modern baths when it was built, and it was under municipal ownership until 2005. The Thongård company purchased the baths from the municipality for NOK 1 million and operates it as a bathing and fitness center.

References

Public baths in Scandinavia
Bathing in Oslo
1921 establishments in Norway
Buildings and structures in Oslo
Buildings and structures completed in 1920